Tognoli is an Italian surname. Notable people with this surname include the following:

Alberto Tognoli (1937–2008), Italian mathematician
Carlo Tognoli (born 1938), Italian politician

See also

Claudio Tognolli

Italian-language surnames